AZ (or similar) may refer to:

Companies and organizations 
 Alkmaar Zaanstreek, formerly AZ '67, a Dutch Eredivisie football club
 AZ (women), the affiliated women's football club (2007–2011)
AstraZeneca, a UK-based pharmaceutical company
 Oxford–AstraZeneca COVID-19 vaccine, their COVID-19 vaccine (sometimes abbreviated as AZ)

 ITA Airways, IATA code for the national airline of Italy

 Ministry of General Affairs, a Dutch Government ministry

Music 
 Authority Zero, an Arizona punk rock band
 AZ (label), a French record label

People
 Az (people), Turkophone people from present-day Russia
 AZ (rapper), a rapper from Brooklyn, New York
 Azie Faison, known as AZ, a former drug dealer from New York

Places
 Arizona, a state in the United States whose postal abbreviation is "AZ"
 Azerbaijan, a Eurasian country, designated by the 2-letter ISO 3166-1 country code

Other uses
 .az, the country code top level domain for the nation of Azerbaijan
 Abendzeitung, a newspaper based in Munich, Germany
 AlphaZero, game-playing artificial intelligence
 Assignment Zero, a crowdsourced journalism project
 Azimuth, the horizontal component of a compass direction
 Azerbaijani language, designated by the ISO 639-1 international-standard language-code "az"
 Toyota AZ engine family
 Azimuth, the horizontal component of a compass direction

See also

 
 
 
 A–Z (disambiguation)
 AZ1 (disambiguation)
 ZA (disambiguation)